Children's Tragedy (German: Kindertragödie) is a 1928 German silent drama film directed by Phil Jutzi and Karl Lutz and starring Hermann Picha, Jaro Fürth and Maria Zelenka. It was made by the Communist-backed studio Prometheus-Film.

Cast
 Hermann Picha 
 Jaro Fürth 
 Maria Zelenka 
 Holmes Zimmermann 
 Hermi Lutz

References

Bibliography
 Bock, Hans-Michael & Bergfelder, Tim. The Concise Cinegraph: Encyclopaedia of German Cinema. Berghahn Books, 2009.

External links

1928 films
Films of the Weimar Republic
German silent feature films
Films directed by Phil Jutzi
German black-and-white films
German drama films
1928 drama films
Silent drama films
1920s German films
1920s German-language films